Ruslan Avleev (born June 4, 1976 in Sarapul, Udmurtia) is a former Russian professional basketball 6'6" power forward of Tatar ethnicity. Started his career as a pro in 1995 with BK EVRAZ. Avleev had played in Russia (EVRAZ, CSKA, UNICS Kazan, Ural Great, and MBC Dynamo Moscow) and Italy (Virtus Bologna 2002-03).

Trophies (Superleague A):
Champion – Ural Great (2002);
Vice-champion – UNICS Kazan (2005);
Bronze Medalist – UNICS Kazan (2001);
Russian Cup winner – Ural Great (2004);

Russian National Team (1999–2002):
1999 FIBA EuroBasket;
2000 Olympic Games;
2002 FIBA World Championship;

References

1976 births
Living people
People from Sarapul
Russian men's basketball players
Olympic basketball players of Russia
Basketball players at the 2000 Summer Olympics
BC UNICS players
PBC Ural Great players
2002 FIBA World Championship players
Sportspeople from Udmurtia